Jamal Khamis Taha (born 23 November 1966) is a football manager and former player who is the head coach of  club Ansar.

Nicknamed "the Brown Gazelle", Taha was born in Egypt to an Egyptian father and a Lebanese mother. He obtained Lebanese citizenship and represented the Lebanon national team between 1993 and 2000, whom he captained at the 2000 AFC Asian Cup.

Early life 
Jamal Taha was born in Cairo, Egypt, to an Egyptian father and a Lebanese mother; he obtained Lebanese citizenship through naturalization in 1992 via a presidential decree. Taha joined Ansar's youth team in 1977.

Club career 
Nicknamed "the Brown Gazelle", Taha began his senior career with Ansar in 1986, where he ended his career in 2002. He wore the number 6 on his jersey, and was the club's captain from 1997 onwards.

International career 
Taha was the national team's captain during the 2000 AFC Asian Cup in Lebanon.

Managerial career

Ansar 
Taha started out as Adnan Hamad's assistant manager at Ansar during the 2005–06 season; he helped his side win the domestic double (Lebanese Premier League and Lebanese FA Cup). The following season, in 2006–07, Taha was appointed first manager of Ansar, winning Ansar's second consecutive domestic double. He remained head coach until the end of the 2007–08 season, where he lost the league title to Ahed by one point.

In July 2011, Taha was re-appointed manager of Ansar, staying there until the end of the 2012–13 season. He won the 2011–12 Lebanese FA Cup, and the 2012 Lebanese Super Cup.

Shabab Sahel and Tadamon Sour 
On 10 September 2013, he took charge of Shabab Sahel; he won the Lebanese Challenge Cup in 2014. After two seasons he returned to Ansar, managing them during the 2015–16 season, before resigning after the first league game of the following season in September 2016.  In January 2017, Taha became manager of Tadamon Sour until June 2018.

Lebanon 
On 3 June 2019, he was appointed assistant manager of the Lebanon national team under Liviu Ciobotariu's tenure. After one year, on 17 June 2020, the Lebanese Football Association (LFA) decided not to extend Ciobotariu's contract, and appointed Taha as the national team's coach. He became the first Lebanese coach of the national team in almost 12 years, since the appointment of Emile Rustom in November 2008.

Under Taha, Lebanon underperformed in their last three fixtures of the second round of 2022 FIFA World Cup qualification, struggling to overcome Sri Lanka 3–2, and losing against Turkmenistan and South Korea; Lebanon qualified Lebanon to the third round as fifth-best runner-up by virtue of other results going in their favour. Taha's tenure wasn't extended following the expiration of his one-year contract on 30 June 2021.

Lebanon U23 
On 27 September 2021, Taha was announced head coach of the Lebanon national under-23 team.

Return to Ansar 
On 26 June 2022, Taha returned as head coach of Ansar.

Career statistics

International 

Scores and results list Lebanon's goal tally first, score column indicates score after each Taha goal.

Managerial

Honours

Player 
Ansar
 Lebanese Premier League: 1987–88, 1989–90, 1990–91, 1991–92, 1992–93, 1993–94, 1994–95, 1995–96, 1996–97, 1997–98, 1998–99
 Lebanese FA Cup: 1987–88, 1989–90, 1990–91, 1991–92, 1993–94, 1994–95, 1995–96, 1998–99, 2001–02
 Lebanese Elite Cup: 1997, 2000
 Lebanese Federation Cup: 1999, 2000
 Lebanese Super Cup: 1996, 1997, 1998, 1999

Individual
 Lebanese Premier League Team of the Season: 1996–97, 1998–99

Manager 
Ansar
 Lebanese Premier League: 2006–07
 Lebanese FA Cup: 2006–07, 2011–12
 Lebanese Super Cup: 2012

Shabab Sahel
 Lebanese Challenge Cup: 2014

See also 
 List of Lebanon international footballers
 List of Lebanon international footballers born outside Lebanon

References

External links 

 
 Jamal Taha at RSSSF
 
 
 
 

1966 births
Living people
Footballers from Cairo
Egyptian footballers
Lebanese footballers
Egyptian emigrants to Lebanon
Egyptian people of Lebanese descent
Sportspeople of North African descent
Sportspeople of Lebanese descent
Naturalized citizens of Lebanon
Association football midfielders
Al Ansar FC players
Lebanese Premier League players
Lebanon international footballers
Asian Games competitors for Lebanon
Footballers at the 1998 Asian Games
2000 AFC Asian Cup players
Association football coaches
Lebanese football managers
Al Ansar FC managers
Shabab Al Sahel FC managers
Tadamon Sour SC managers
Lebanon national football team managers
Lebanese Premier League managers